Ayeni Adekunle is a Nigerian entrepreneur, writer and published author. He is the founder of Black House Media Group, headquartered in Ikeja, Lagos, Nigeria.

Background and early career
Ayeni Adekunle hails from Ondo State, southwestern Nigeria. He had his primary and secondary education in Lagos, and his University education at the University of Ibadan, Ibadan, Oyo State where he bagged a Bachelor of Science (B.Sc) degree in Microbiology. After graduating from the University of Ibadan, he joined Encomium Weekly as showbiz columnist, having had a stint as a feature editor with Hip Hop World Magazine. He then moved to ThisDay, after which he joined The Punch as a columnist in July 2008.

Entrepreneurship
Ayeni Adekunle left The Punch to found Nigeria Entertainment Today (NET), a newspaper and web portal specially dedicated to reportage of entertainment in Nigeria and Africa. It has since become an online platform and is branded TheNETng. He is the convener of Nigeria Entertainment Conference NEC Live, "an annual deliberative conference of Nigerian entertainers drawn from all sectors of creative industry, media and economic policy makers which discusses industry development issues."

Ayeni founded Black House Media in 2006 for public relations services. The company has grown into a conglomerate with subsidiaries like: ID Africa, Plaqad, Neusroom, 234Star, NET, Orin, NET Shop and NEC. In 2012, he led a team of software and content developers in [Nigeria] to unveil the BHM App, an app for public relations experts.

Awards and honours
Described in Forbes Africa Magazine as "one of the pioneers who led Nigeria into the digital-first strategy era of Marketing Communications", Ayeni was named Nigeria's PR Practitioner of the Year in 2017. The Same year, the Lagos State chapter of the Nigerian Institute of Public Relations (NIPR) named his company, Black House Media, the winner of two awards: — Agency of the Year and Best Agency to Work. His other company, ID Africa, emerged as the Best PR Agency for Use of New Media in 2018, the same year BHM clinched the PR Agency of the Year category at the Brandcom Awards. In 2019, Ayeni Adekunle was named Fellow of the Nigerian Institute of Marketing (NIMN) "in recognition of his contribution to the marketing profession."

References

External links
 Official website
 Forbes Africa Biographical Feature

Living people
Nigerian businesspeople
21st-century Nigerian businesspeople
Nigerian company founders
University of Ibadan alumni
Yoruba businesspeople
People from Ondo State
Nigerian newspaper founders
Public relations people
Year of birth missing (living people)